James Frederic Rothenberg, CFA, (July 16, 1946 – July 21, 2015), "a leading figure in the investment world", served as president and director of Capital Research and Management Co. (a principal subsidiary of the Capital Group Companies Inc.) and as investment adviser to American Funds.

Born in Pittsburgh, Rothenberg was an alumnus of both Harvard College and Harvard Business School and at the time of his death was a member of the Harvard Corporation. Until he was replaced by Paul Finnegan in 2014, he had also served as the University's treasurer.

Rothenberg was also a trustee of the California Institute of Technology and donated $15 million to Caltech in March, 2015. He was also a member of the Committee on Capital Markets Regulation.

He died on July 21, 2015, of a heart attack.

References

External links
James F. Rothenberg, '68 Member of the Harvard Corporation and Chairman of Capital Research
JAMES FREDERIC ROTHENBERG director information. Free director information. 
Businessweek Executive Profile James F. Rothenberg CFA

Harvard Business School alumni
1946 births
2015 deaths
Private equity and venture capital investors
Directors of Harvard Management Company
California Institute of Technology trustees
20th-century American businesspeople
Harvard College alumni
CFA charterholders